Yehuda Lapidot (born August 13, 1928) is an Israeli historian, former professor of biochemistry, and veteran of the Zionist militia Irgun.

Yehuda Lapidot was born in Mandatory Palestine in 1928. At age 15, he joined Irgun, taking the nom de guerre "Nimrod". He was active in the Irgun's Combat Corps (Hayil Kravi), and was responsible for maintaining weapons arsenals in Ramat Gan and Bnei Brak.

During the Jewish insurgency in Palestine, he took part in anti-British operations. In April 1946, he participated in a major operation to sabotage the railway network in southern Palestine, and was severely wounded in the arm. While recuperating from his injury, which prevented him from using a gun, he worked in the Irgun's propaganda department, where he was director of its foreign press section. In 1947, he was transferred to Jerusalem, and served as a commander during  the 1947-1948 Civil War in Mandatory Palestine. Initially, his role was to train new recruits. His most notable action during this period was taking part in a joint Irgun-Lehi attack on the Arab village of Deir Yassin, it what would later become known as the Deir Yassin massacre. After Benzion Cohen, the overall Irgun commander of the operation, was wounded, he took charge of the Irgun force and led it through most of the fighting.

During the 1948 Arab-Israeli War, he served as a company commander, and took part in fighting at Ramat Rachel and in Operation Kedem, during which he led a unit that was part of the final Israeli attempt to capture Jerusalem's Old City during the war. His force successfully broke through the New Gate and into the Old City, where his attack bogged down, while other Israeli forces failed to reach their objectives, and Israeli commanders ordered a general retreat due to an imminent cease-fire about to come into effect. He also led the establishment of the agricultural training farm at Shuni Fortress.

In 1949, he began studying biochemistry at the Hebrew University of Jerusalem, and received a PhD in biochemistry in 1960. He worked on the biosynthesis of proteins. In 1973, he was appointed a professor of biochemistry at the Hebrew University.

In 1980, he was appointed head of Nativ, an Israeli liaison organization maintaining contacts with Jews living in the Eastern Bloc, by Israeli Prime Minister (and former Irgun commander) Menachem Begin. He served in this position until 1985.

In 1988, he retired from the Hebrew University and began researching the history of the British Palestine Mandate era, especially the history of the Irgun, and wrote several books on this field.

Bibliography
Besieged Jerusalem 1948: Memories of an Irgun Fighter

References

Biography
Raviv, Dan and Melman, Yossi. Every Spy a Prince: The Complete History of Israel's Intelligence Community. Boston: Houghton Mifflin Company, 1990. 

Irgun members
Academic staff of the Hebrew University of Jerusalem
Israeli biochemists
Israeli historians
Living people
1928 births
Terrorism in Mandatory Palestine